According to the Book of Mormon, Gid  was a Nephite military officer.  He is first mentioned as the leader of a band of soldiers Helaman had chosen to take a large body of Lamanite prisoners to Zarahemla.  When news reached of a fresh Lamanite army attacking the main Nephite army, the prisoners revolted.  Gid then led his men in killing the greater number of these prisoners before returning to help Helaman defeat the attacking army.  He later took part in a strategic maneuver that led to the Lamanites abandoning all Nephite cities in his area.

References

Book of Mormon people